Wolf Point is an incorporated town in Roosevelt County, Montana.

Wolf Point may also refer to

Wolf Point (Amtrak station), Wolf Point, Montana
Wolf Point, Chicago, the confluence of three branches of the Chicago River

See also
Wolf Point Airport